Malvaloca may refer to:

 Malvaloca (play), a 1912 play by the Quintero brothers
 Malvaloca (1926 film), a silent Spanish film directed by Benito Perojo 
 Malvaloca (1942 film), a Spanish film directed by Luis Marquina 
 Malvaloca (1954 film), a Spanish film directed by Ramón Torrado